The Arkansas Traveler is an open-pollinated heirloom variety of tomato that was bred by the University of Arkansas in 1968. The plant is indeterminate with round red fruits weighing approximately 6 ounces.

References

See also
 List of tomato cultivars

Tomato cultivars